Dominik Špiriak (born 22 March 1999) is a Slovak professional footballer who last played as a defender for Komárno in the Slovak 2. Liga.

Club career
Špiriak began his football career at ŠK Senec, where he signed his first professional contract during the 2015–16 season. In 2017, he moved to Dunajská Streda, where he eventually made his professional Fortuna Liga debut against FK Železiarne Podbrezová on October 20, 2018. During his time with Dunajská Streda, he was loaned out to fellow Slovak sides Komárno and Zemplín Michalovce. In July 2019, Špiriak was loaned out to Greek Super League 2 side Ergotelis for the duration of the 2019–20 season.

Pohronie
In July 2020, Špiriak signed with Pohronie. Initially, he enjoyed generous play-time until late November, when he suffered a knee injury in an away fixture against Žilina, which had ruled him out of play until mid-March. Even until June, he only returned to play as a second-half substitute.

References

External links
 FC DAC 1904 Dunajská Streda official club profile 
 
 Futbalnet profile 
 

1999 births
Living people
Footballers from Bratislava
Slovak footballers
Slovakia youth international footballers
Slovakia under-21 international footballers
Slovak expatriate footballers
Association football defenders
ŠK Senec players
KFC Komárno players
FC DAC 1904 Dunajská Streda players
MFK Zemplín Michalovce players
Ergotelis F.C. players
FK Pohronie players
Slovak Super Liga players
2. Liga (Slovakia) players
Super League Greece 2 players
Expatriate footballers in Greece
Slovak expatriate sportspeople in Greece